This is a list of current members of the Supreme Council of Kyrgyzstan.

List

References

Supreme Council